Pleasant Hill is an unincorporated community in Calhoun County, West Virginia, United States.

References

Unincorporated communities in Calhoun County, West Virginia
Unincorporated communities in West Virginia